Raja Waseh Turk (born in Madina market , Muzaffarabad) is an Azad Kashmiri politician who served as the Prime Minister of Azad Jammu And Kashmir from 2011 to 2016. He has been the President of the Pakistan Peoples Party in Azad Kashmir since 2007.

References

Politicians from Azad Kashmir
People from Mirpur District
Living people
Prime Ministers of Azad Kashmir
Pakistan People's Party politicians
Year of birth missing (living people)
Punjabi people